Monty J. Pearce (born September 29, 1948) was an American politician who served as a member of the Idaho Senate from 2002 to 2014 representing, the 9th district. He previously served the Idaho House of Representatives for district 9, seat B, from 1999 to 2002.

Early life and education 
Pearce was born in Sacramento, California and raised in New Plymouth, Idaho. He received an associate's degree from Ricks College and a Bachelor of Arts degree from Brigham Young University.

Career 
He is a successful rancher, raising purebred Black and Red Angus cattle and Quarterhorses on his ranch near New Plymouth.

Pearce served as a member of the Idaho Senate from 2002 to 2014, representing the 9th district until he lost to Abby Lee in the Republican primary. Pearce was a member of the Idaho State House of Representatives from 1999 to 2002.

Pearce endorsed Ron Paul in the 2012 Republican Party presidential primaries.

Personal life 
He is married to Merry Pearce and they have seven children.

References

1948 births
American Latter Day Saints
Brigham Young University alumni
Living people
Politicians from Sacramento, California
Republican Party Idaho state senators
People from Payette County, Idaho